Jaret D. Holmes (born March 3, 1976) is a former American football placekicker in the National Football League for the Chicago Bears (1999), the New York Giants (2000) and the Jacksonville Jaguars (2001).  He played high school football at Clinton High School.  Holmes played college football at Hinds Community College and Auburn University.

External links
 Stats from databasefootball.com

1976 births
Living people
American football placekickers
Hinds Eagles football players
Auburn Tigers football players
Chicago Bears players
Jacksonville Jaguars players
New York Giants players
People from Clinton, Mississippi